The following is a list of episodes of the Inspector Gadget television series.

Series overview

Episodes

Pilot (1982)

Season 1 (1983)

Season 2 (1985–86)
In 1985, Inspector Gadget was revived for a second season. Unlike its predecessor, season 2 was broadcast weekly rather than daily. The 21 episodes of season 2 were broadcast on Saturday mornings between September 14, 1985 and February 1, 1986.

See also
List of Inspector Gadget (2015 TV series) episodes

References

Lists of American children's animated television series episodes
Lists of American comedy television series episodes
Lists of Canadian children's animated television series episodes
Lists of French animated television series episodes